Ressiana is an ancient Roman city of the province of Numidia in present in what is now Algeria and a smaller part of Tunisia, North Africa. 
The city was the seat of a bishopric, which exists now only as a titular see. 
Bishop Franc Šuštar, auxiliary bishop of Ljubljana is the current titular bishop.

Bishops
1948–2003 Adalbert Boros  
2003–2008 John Michael Quinn
2008–2015 Jean-Pierre Batut
since 2015 Franc Šuštar

References

Catholic titular sees in Africa
Numidia (Roman provinces)
7th-century disestablishments in the Exarchate of Africa